The Society for the Scientific Study of Religion (founded in 1949) was formed to advance research in the social scientific perspective on religious institutions and experiences. The Journal for the Scientific Study of Religion is published by the society to provide a forum for empirical papers in the topic area.

Presidents

 1954–1955: Prentiss Pemberton
 1955–1956: Horace Kallen
 Richard McCann
 1959: James Luther Adams
 1961: Horace Kallen
 1962–1963: Horace L. Friess
 1966–1967: Peter L. Berger
 1967–1968: Charles Y. Glock
 1970–1971: Joseph H. Fichter
  – : James E. Dittes
 1978–1979: William V. D'Antonio
 1980–1981: Guy Benton Johnson
 1983–1984: Jeffrey K. Hadden
 1985: Phillip E. Hammond
 1988–1989: Meredith B. McGuire
 Donald Eric Capps
 1993: Eileen Barker
 1996–1997: Wade Clark Roof
 1998–1999: Nicholas Jay Demerath III
 Michele Dillon
 2014–2015: Fenggang Yang
 2018: Korie L. Edwards
 2019: Elaine Howard Ecklund
 2019–present: Laura Olson

See also

 American Academy of Religion
 Association for the Social Scientific Study of Jewry
 Association for the Sociology of Religion
 Canadian Society for the Study of Religion
 Psychology of religion
 Religious Research Association
 Religious studies
 Sociology of religion

References

Footnotes

Bibliography

Further reading

External links
 

Academic organizations based in the United States
Organizations based in Indiana
Organizations established in 1949
Religious studies